This table displays the top-rated primetime television series of the 1950–51 season as measured by Nielsen Media Research.

References

1950 in American television
1951 in American television
1950-related lists
1951-related lists
Lists of American television series